Palladium(II) bromide is an inorganic compound of palladium and bromine with the chemical formula PdBr2. It is a commercially available, though less common than palladium(II) chloride, the usual entry point to palladium chemistry. Unlike the chloride, palladium(II) bromide is insoluble in water, but dissolves when heated in acetonitrile to give monomeric acetonitrile adducts:

 PdBr2 + 2 MeCN → PdBr2(MeCN)2

The structure of PdBr2 has been determined by X-ray crystallography. It crystallises in the P21/c space group and the structure consists of wavy ribbons of edge-sharing PdBr4 coordination squares.

References

Palladium compounds
Bromides
Platinum group halides